Northwestern California University School of Law is an online-based law school in Sacramento, California, founded in 1982.

It is accredited by the State Bar of California, and is approved to award the Juris Doctor degree upon completion and graduation from the program. Although it is accredited by Committee of Bar Examiners of the State Bar of California, it is not accredited by the American Bar Association (ABA), as the ABA generally does not accredit online-only law schools.

Online Law Education
The school delivers courses entirely through a distance education format. The main teaching medium is the internet by means of virtual classrooms, discussion boards, live online audio and video lectures, online study groups, and the use of videoconferencing. NWCU Law offers its courses through eJuris, an online law school platform developed by the school. All students are also provided with access to LexisNexis and to CALI.

NWCU is a part time program spanning four years of continuous study. As a part time program the NWCU Law program is regulated according to the standards set by the State Bar of California, requiring a cumulative 3,600 hours of verified academic engagement and study. Foundational classes are taught in year long blocks requiring a 12-month course of study.

Degrees Offered
NWCU offers the Juris Doctor (J.D.) law degree. Graduates receive the J.D. degree after the successful completion of their 4L year.

Accreditation
Northwestern California University School of Law is approved and accredited by the Committee of Bar Examiners of the State Bar of California. Students to whom the school awards the JD degree are eligible to take the California Bar Examination and become licensed in the State of California. The school is not accredited by the American Bar Association (ABA) due to being an online-only institution. As a result, students are generally not permitted to take the bar exam outside of California immediately after graduation. Currently 23 states allow graduates to take their respective bar exams and be admitted to practice law after passing the bar in California and practicing for a set number of years

Tuition 
NWCU's tuition is $3,900 per year, not inclusive of books or other expenses. The total tuition for the four-year program is $15,600.

Notable alumni
Max Hardberger, maritime security specialist and author.
 Mark Whitacre, President of Archer Daniels Midland's bioproducts division, who became a whistleblower under U.S. federal whistleblower statutes. The movie The Informant starring Matt Damon was based on Whitacre's role in the ADM price-fixing case.

References

External links
 

Law schools in California
Educational institutions established in 1982
Distance education institutions based in the United States
1982 establishments in California
Education in Sacramento, California
Online law schools in the United States